Rao Manik Chand Jatav- was a Dalit activist and Member of 1st Lok Sabha from Sawai Madhopur, Rajasthan.

Biography
Manik Chand Jatav-vir was born to Shri Bab Saheb Bhola Nath Jatav-Vir and Smt. Vishastra Devi in March 1897 at Agra, North-Western Provinces (now Uttar Pradesh). He got his education at St. John's College, Agra.  He was imprisoned in connection with Dalit Uplift movement in 1947. He had a lifelong interest in Dalit Uplift and Social Services. He lived in Vir Bhawan, Raja ki Mandi, Agra (U.P.)

Posts held

Recognition
 In 1943, Viceroy awarded a prize for services to Depressed Classes
 Became Rao Sahib and then Jagir in 1945.

References

India MPs 1952–1957
Lok Sabha members from Rajasthan
Dalit activists
People from Agra
1897 births
Year of death missing
Activists from Rajasthan
People from Sawai Madhopur district